The Bulletin of the Royal College of Surgeons of England is an open access periodical published 10 times a year by the Royal College of Surgeons of England. It covers the field of surgery, including non-clinical research, as well as publishing and  information on college activities. The editor-in-chief is Jonathan Glass. Online access to current and past issues is free.

Editorial board 

, the editorial board is as follows:

References

External links 
 
 Online access at Ingenta Connect
 Print: 
 Online; 

Surgery journals
English-language journals
Open access journals